{{Taxobox
| domain = Bacteria
| phylum = Pseudomonadota
| classis = Alphaproteobacteria
| ordo = Sphingomonadales
| familia = Sphingomonadaceae
| genus = Sphingopyxis
| species = S. panaciterrae'
| binomial = Sphingopyxis panaciterrae| binomial_authority = Lee et al. 2011
| type_strain = KCTC 12580, LMG 24003, Gsoil 124
| subdivision = 
| synonyms = 
}}Sphingopyxis panaciterrae is a Gram-negative, strictly aerobic and motile bacterium from the genus of Sphingopyxis'' which has been isolated from soil from a ginseng field from Pocheon in Korea.

References

Sphingomonadales
Bacteria described in 2011